G2000 (Generation 2000) Group was founded by Michael Tien in 1980 in Hong Kong. The label G2000, first introduced in 1985, was positioned as a specialty clothing chain distributing fashionable men's and women's career wear. Today, the G2000 Group is a multi-brand specialty retailer offering an assortment of men's and women's apparel and accessories, operating under different labels: G2000 MAN, G2000 WOMAN, G2000 Black and At Twenty.

Today, the Group operates over 700 outlets in the region covering Hong Kong, Macau, China, Singapore, Malaysia, Taiwan, Thailand, Indonesia, Philippines, Vietnam, Cambodia, Cyprus, Saudi Arabia, the United Arab Emirates, Bahrain, Qatar and Jordan.

The brand was originally catered for Asian consumers and clothing sizes.

Associated brands 
 G2000 (men & women)
 G2000 Black (men; understated luxury)
 At Twenty (men)
 U2 (men)

Locations

Asia 
  (Headquarters)

Middle East 
 
 
 
 
  ( closed )

Caribbean

South America

References

 G2000 web site
Asia Times Magazine 'First Person', 6 Dec 2012 
G2000 banks on technology and laser-sharp focus for growth, 31 Mar 2020 

Clothing brands of Hong Kong
Clothing companies of Hong Kong
Clothing companies established in 1980
Retail companies established in 1980